The Grand Prix International St. Gervais was an annual senior-level international figure skating competition held in Saint-Gervais-les-Bains, France. For many years, beginning in 1969, it was paired with a similar competition in Germany, the Nebelhorn Trophy, to form a series called the Coupe des Alpes. Sometimes the "Coupe des Alpes" name was applied to the French event only, but in fact it was a team trophy awarded based on combined results of both competitions. The official name of the competition was unrelated to and predated the use of "Grand Prix" in the ISU Grand Prix of Figure Skating.

History 
The St. Gervais and Nebelhorn events were traditionally held in late summer or early fall as the first international skating events of the season. In 1979, the French event was held in late August. In most years, the same teams of skaters entered both events. As these events predated the establishment of a regular junior competition circuit, younger skaters were often sent to St. Gervais and Nebelhorn as their first senior-level international competition assignments.

In 1997, the St. Gervais event was separated from the Nebelhorn Trophy and the Coupe des Alpes was discontinued. Instead, the French federation organized an international junior competition in St. Gervais as part of the inaugural 1997–98 ISU Junior Series, which was later renamed the ISU Junior Grand Prix of Figure Skating. In recent years, the French junior competition has been held in Courchevel instead.

Medalists

Men

Ladies

Pairs

Ice dancing

References

Benjamin T. Wright, Skating in America.
Results published in Skating magazine

Figure skating competitions
International figure skating competitions hosted by France